Methylopila jiangsuensis is a Gram-negative, aerobic, facultatively methanotrophic and non-spore-forming bacterium species from the genus Methylopila which has been isolated from activated sludge from a waste water treatment plant from Yangzhou in the Jiangsu Province in China.

References

Further reading

External links
Type strain of Methylopila jiangsuensis at BacDive -  the Bacterial Diversity Metadatabase

Methylocystaceae
Bacteria described in 2011